Marcia Frederick (born January 4, 1963, in Springfield, Massachusetts) is a retired American gymnast who was the first American woman to win a gold medal at the World Gymnastics Championships, on the uneven bars in Strasbourg, France, in 1978. After qualifying for the 1980 US Olympic team, she was among the favorites to win a medal in Moscow but did not compete because of the boycott of the 1980 Summer Olympics led by the United States. At the USGF International Invitational held in August 1980 in Hartford, Connecticut, for countries affected by the boycott, Frederick won the silver medal in the all-around competition, the gold on vault and bronze on uneven bars and balance beam. Years later, she was one of 461 athletes to receive a Congressional Gold Medal.

Eponymous skill
Frederick has one eponymous skill listed in the Code of Points.

References

1963 births
American female artistic gymnasts
World champion gymnasts
Living people
Congressional Gold Medal recipients
Originators of elements in artistic gymnastics
21st-century American women
20th-century American women